The men's ISSF 25 meter rapid fire pistol was one of the fifteen shooting events at the 1996 Summer Olympics. Ralf Schumann defended his title from Barcelona, setting two new Olympic records. Schumann was the third man to successfully defend an Olympic title in the rapid fire pistol, and the first (and, as of the 2016 Games, only) to win three or more medals in the event; he would finish with three golds and five total medals. Emil Milev of Bulgaria (silver) and Vladimir Vokhmyanin of Kazakhstan (bronze) each won their nation's first medal in the event, though Vokhmyanin was a repeat bronze medalist (for the Unified Team in 1992), making him the 10th man to win multiple medals in the event. There were 23 competitors from 19 nations. Nations had been limited to two shooters each since the 1952 Games.

Background
This was the 20th appearance of what had been standardised in 1948 as the men's ISSF 25 meter rapid fire pistol event, the only event on the 2020 programme that traces back to 1896. The event has been held at every Summer Olympics except 1904 and 1928 (when no shooting events were held) and 1908; it was nominally open to women from 1968 to 1980, although very few women participated these years. There is no women's equivalent on the Olympic programme, as of 2021. The first five events were quite different, with some level of consistency finally beginning with the 1932 event—which, though it had differences from the 1924 competition, was roughly similar. The 1936 competition followed the 1932 one quite closely. The post-World War II event substantially altered the competition once again. The 1984 Games introduced women's-only shooting events, including the ISSF 25 meter pistol (though this is more similar to the non-Olympic men's ISSF 25 meter center-fire pistol than the rapid fire pistol).

Seven of the eight semifinalists from 1992 returned: gold medalist (and 1988 silver medalist) Ralf Schumann of Germany, silver medalist (and 1988 gold medalist) Afanasijs Kuzmins of Latvia, bronze medalist Vladimir Vokhmyanin of the Unified Team (now competing for Kazakhstan), fourth-place finisher Krzysztof Kucharczyk of Poland, fifth-place finisher (and 1988 finalist) John McNally of the United States, sixth-place finisher Miroslav Ignatiuk of the Unified Team (now competing for Ukraine), and eighth-place finisher (and 1988 finalist) Bernardo Tobar of Colombia. Kucharczyk had won the 1994 world championship, with Emil Milev of Bulgaria second and Schumann (the 1990 world champion) third. 

Croatia, Kazakhstan, Moldova, and Ukraine each made their debut in the event. The United States made its 17th appearance, most of any nation.

Competition format
The competition format dropped the three-round format used in 1992 and went back to a two-round (qualifying round and final) format, as in 1988.

The qualifying round from 1988 onward was essentially the same as the full competition format from 1948–1984. Each shooter fired 60 shots. These were done in two courses of 30; each course consisted of two stages of 15; each stage consisted of three series of 5. In each stage, the time limit for each series was 8 seconds for the first, 6 seconds for the second, and 4 seconds for the third. 

The 1988 tournament had added a two-series final for the top eight shooters; the 1992 competition broke that down to a four-series semifinal for the top eight and two-series final for the top four. In 1996, the top eight once again advanced to the final.

In the final, each shooter fired two five-shot series at 4 seconds. Scoring in the final was to 1/10 of a point, with each shot worth up to 10.9 points (for a final round maximum of 109, and total maximum of 709). It was the first time scoring to 1/10 of a point was done in the Olympic rapid fire pistol.

The 1992 competition had introduced round targets rather than the silhouettes used from 1948 to 1988 as well as many pre-World War II versions of the event. Score, rather than hits, had been used as the primary ranking method since 1960.

Records
Prior to the competition, the existing world and Olympic records were as follows.

 Two courses (60 shots, 600 maximum)

Ralf Schumann broke his own Olympic record in the qualifying round with 596 points. His total of 698.0 points was the inaugural record for the new format.

Schedule

Results

Qualifying

Final

References

Sources

Shooting at the 1996 Summer Olympics
Men's 1996
Men's events at the 1996 Summer Olympics